The 1985–86 Magyar Kupa (English: Hungarian Cup) was the 46th season of Hungary's annual knock-out cup football competition.

Final

See also
 1985–86 Nemzeti Bajnokság I

References

External links
 Official site 
 soccerway.com

1985–86 in Hungarian football
1985–86 domestic association football cups
1985-86